Gift Wrapped may refer to:

 Gift Wrapped (film), 1952 Looney Tunes short film starring Tweety and Sylvester the Cat
 Gift Wrapped (game show), British quiz show
 Gift Wrapped – 20 Songs That Keep on Giving!, 2009 Christmas compilation album
 Gift Wrapped, Vol. II, 2010 sequel

See also
 Gift wrapping